Dingxi (formerly transliterated as Tinghsi Station until 2003) is a metro station in New Taipei, Taiwan served by the Taipei Metro.

Station overview

This two-level, underground station has an island platform and two exits.

The area above ground is currently being changed into a new lion-grade building.

History
The station got its current name on 27 February 2011. This was the result of a reorganization on 25 December 2010, when the territory was incorporated into New Taipei. Service began with the opening of the Zhonghe Line. Another accessibility elevator was opened at exit 1; it was completed after a year of construction.

Station layout

Exits
Exit 1: Yonghe Rd. Sec. 2 and Zhongxing St. 
Exit 2: Yonghe Rd. Sec. 2 and Wenhua Rd.

Around the station
Lehua Night Market
Green River Park
Yonghe Emerald Riverside Park
Yonghe Bike Rental

References

Railway stations opened in 1998
Zhonghe–Xinlu line stations